Pritam Deb is an Indian physicist, nanoscientist and a professor of physics at Tezpur University. He is known for his studies on nanoscience and technology as well as the physics of materials and has published a number of articles; ResearchGate, an online repository of scientific articles has listed 86 of them. Besides, he has also published a book, Kinetics of Heterogeneous Solid State Processes, on nonisothermal kinetics.

Deb was a part of the team that successfully campaigned for selecting Tezpur University as a nodal center for establishing the Technology Enabling Centre (TEC) of the Department of Science and Technology. The Department of Biotechnology of the Government of India awarded him the National Bioscience Award for Career Development, one of the highest Indian science awards, for his contributions to biosciences, in 2017–18.

Selected bibliography

Books

Articles

See also 

 Reaction progress kinetic analysis
 Janus particles

Notes

References

External links 
 

N-BIOS Prize recipients
Indian scientific authors
Living people
Year of birth missing (living people)
Scientists from Assam
Indian nanotechnologists
Academic staff of Tezpur University
21st-century Indian physicists